Nenad Zimonjić (born 4 June 1976) is a Serbian former professional tennis player who was ranked world No. 1 in doubles.

He is an eight-time Grand Slam champion, having won the 2008 and 2009 Wimbledon Championships as well as the 2010 French Open in men's doubles partnering Daniel Nestor. In mixed doubles, Zimonjić won the 2004 Australian Open partnering Elena Bovina, the 2006 and 2010 French Opens partnering Katarina Srebotnik, the 2008 Australian Open partnering Sun Tiantian, and the 2014 Wimbledon Championships partnering Samantha Stosur. He has also reached nine further major finals across the two disciplines.

Zimonjić won 54 doubles titles on the ATP Tour, including the 2008 and 2010 Tour Finals, and 15 Masters 1000-level titles. He became the world No. 1 for the first time in November 2008, going on to spend 50 weeks at the top of the rankings over the next two years. Zimonjić was the second Serbian to top the doubles rankings, after Slobodan Živojinović in 1986.

In singles, he reached his career-high ranking of world No. 176 in March 1999, and achieved his best major result at the Wimbledon Championships that year, reaching the third round. Zimonjić represented Serbia in the Davis Cup from 1995 to 2017, competing in 55 ties and earning 43 victories, making him the most successful Davis Cup player in Serbian history. He was also part of the team that won the tournament in 2010, and served as captain from 2017 to 2020, overseeing Serbia's victory at the inaugural ATP Cup in 2020. Zimonjić also competed at the Olympic Games on four occasions.

Career

Doubles
Zimonjić turned pro in 1995 and remained relatively unknown outside his native country until a surprise victory in the mixed doubles at the 2004 Australian Open. Paired for the first time with Russian Elena Bovina, he beat defending champions Martina Navratilova and Leander Paes in straight sets in an hour and nine minutes. Alongside Katarina Srebotnik of Slovenia, he won the 2006 French Open crown with a straight-sets victory over Daniel Nestor and Elena Likhovtseva. At the 2006 Wimbledon Championships, Zimonjić reached the final of the men's doubles alongside France's Fabrice Santoro and the quarterfinals of the mixed doubles.

In 2007, Zimonjić reached the 2007 French Open mixed doubles final as the defending champions with Katarina Srebotnik and lost to Nathalie Dechy and Andy Ram. He left Santoro after Wimbledon and teamed with Mahesh Bhupathi until after the 2007 US Open. After the US Open, Nenad left Bhupathi and partnered with Daniel Nestor, who won the French Open earlier in the year alongside Mark Knowles. The team won the 2007 St. Petersburg Open, without losing a set. Nestor and Zimonjić later won 2008 Wimbledon (Zimonjić's first Grand Slam), 2009 Wimbledon and 2010 French Open.

In 2009, they defended their Wimbledon title & won 5 Masters 1000 titles. At the World Team Cup as a part of the Serbian team. With Victor Troicki, he won two decisive games against Italian and Argentinian teams; as a result, Serbia finished first in its group, and then proceeded to beat Germany in the final encounter.

In 2010, they finished runners-up at the Australian Open, later on in the year he won both the doubles with Daniel Nestor and the mixed doubles with Katarina Srebotnik at Roland Garros. Zimonjic ended his partnership with Nestor after winning the ATP World Tour Finals.

In 2011, he partnered with Michaël Llodra, with whom he won one Masters 1000 title & four ATP 500 titles. Their partnership ended mid-way through 2012, after Roland Garros. In 2014, Zimonjic & Nestor renewed their partnership, which saw them both return to the top 10 by May & ranked 3 by the end of the year. In 2015 he started the year partnering Aisam-ul-Haq Qureshi, then teamed up with Marcin Matkowski; despite not winning a title together, the Polish-Serbian duo qualified for the World Tour Finals. Zimonjic won titles each year for 16 straight seasons and finished 12 consecutive seasons, starting in 2004, ranked in the ATP doubles top 20. Since 2016, when he played doubles at the Rio Olympics with Novak Djokovic, Zimonjic hasn't had a steady partner for a full season.

On 26 July 2017 the Serbian became the 10th player to record 700 doubles match wins (or more).

In June 2018, Zimonjic underwent bilateral hip replacement surgery.  He returned to the ATP tour in February 2019 at the Sofia Open, where he and compatriot Viktor Troicki had won the doubles title two years prior.

He has a very powerful first serve that he can hit at up to 235 km/h (146 mph).

Retirement and inaugural Wimbledon mixed invitation doubles win
Although Zimonjic never officially announced his retirement, he played his last competitive match at Dubai Tennis Championships 2021.

Partnering Marion Bartoli, Zimonjic won the inaugural Wimbledon mixed invitation doubles 2022. They beat Todd Woodbridge and Cara Black in straight sets in the final.

Singles
In August 1994, Zimonjić won his first professional singles title, beating Miles MacLagan on clay at a satellite tournament in Hungary. He went on to win four other ITF satellite events, as well as four Challenger tour titles in singles: Kiev (Ukraine) in 1998, Belo Horizonte (Brazil) in 2000, Andrezieux (France) in 2001, and Belgrade (Serbia) in 2004. In 2004, he defeated Andre Agassi in St Pölten, and in 2005 on the grass of Halle, he defeated Nicolas Kiefer. Other recognised opponents include Ivo Karlovic in 2000, Nicolas Mahut in 2001.

Davis Cup and ATP Cup

Zimonjić has been a member of Serbia Davis Cup team (previously Yugoslavia Davis Cup team and Serbia and Montenegro Davis Cup team, respectively) since 1995, playing both singles and doubles, and in 2003–2004 he was the playing captain of the national team. In recent years, with the emergence of highly ranked Serbian singles players Novak Djokovic, Janko Tipsarević, and Viktor Troicki, Zimonjić became a doubles specialist on the team, partnering all of them, as well as Dušan Vemić and Ilija Bozoljac.

In 2010, Serbia won its first ever Davis Cup title, following the victories over United States (3–2), Croatia (4–1), Czech Republic (3–2), and France in the final match (3–2). Zimonjić played in all four doubles rubbers over the course of the competition, winning once (against Croatia, partnering Tipsarević) and losing the other three times (partnering Tipsarević, Djokovic, and Troicki, respectively). To celebrate the win, all the players shaved their heads. The central celebration was held in Belgrade in front of several thousand fans, and the Serbian national postal service issued a stamp picturing the players.

In the 2013 quarterfinals against the United States, he and Ilija Bozoljac had an impressive five set victory against the no. 1 ranked Bryan brothers.

Zimonjić was named Serbia Davis Cup team captain in 2003-2004 and from January 2017 till December 2020 when he was unexpectedly replaced by Victor Troicki. He was also the 2020 ATP Cup captain when Serbia won the inaugural 2020 cup.

Personal life
Zimonjić was born in Belgrade, and was brought up in the Borča suburb, while he is currently living in New Belgrade. Zimonjić's paternal family hails from the Gacko region in Herzegovina, from where it settled in Vučkovica near Kragujevac, while his mother was born in Gospić, in Lika. The family's slava (feast day) is Aranđelovdan. He is related to Bogdan Zimonjić (1813–1909), a Serbian Orthodox priest and guerilla leader.

In 2008, he married former model Mina Knežević. On 4 December 2008 his wife gave birth to twins, Leon and Luna.

Significant finals

Grand Slam

Men's doubles: 7 (3–4)

Mixed doubles: 10 (5–5)

Year-end championships

Doubles: 3 (2–1)

ATP career finals

Doubles: 91 (54 titles, 37 runner-ups)

Team competition finals: 4 (3–1)

Performance timelines

Singles

Doubles
{|class="nowrap wikitable" style=text-align:center;font-size:81%
|-
|
|colspan=9|
|colspan=3| FRY
|colspan=16|
|colspan=3|
|-
!Tournament!!1995!!1996!!1997!!1998!!1999!!2000!!2001!!2002!!2003!!2004!!2005!!2006!!2007!!2008!!2009!!2010!!2011!!2012!!2013!!2014!!2015!!2016!!2017!!2018!!2019!!2020!!2021!!2022!!!!!!Win%
|-
|colspan=32 align=left|Grand Slam tournaments
|-
|align=left|
|A
|A
|A
|A
|bgcolor=afeeee|1R
|bgcolor=afeeee|1R
|bgcolor=yellow|SF
|bgcolor=afeeee|2R
|bgcolor=afeeee|1R
|bgcolor=afeeee|2R
|bgcolor=afeeee|3R
|bgcolor=afeeee|1R
|bgcolor=ffebcd|QF
|bgcolor=ffebcd|QF
|bgcolor=afeeee|2R
|bgcolor=thistle|F
|bgcolor=ffebcd|QF
|bgcolor=afeeee|3R
|bgcolor=afeeee|2R
|bgcolor=yellow|SF
|bgcolor=afeeee|3R
|A
|bgcolor=afeeee|2R
|bgcolor=afeeee|1R
|A
|A
|A
|A
|0 / 19
|35–19
|65%
|-
|align=left|French Open
|A
|A
|A
|A
|A
|bgcolor=afeeee|1R
|bgcolor=afeeee|1R
|A
|bgcolor=afeeee|2R
|bgcolor=afeeee|2R
|bgcolor=ffebcd|QF
|bgcolor=afeeee|1R
|bgcolor=yellow|SF
|bgcolor=thistle|F
|bgcolor=yellow|SF
|bgcolor=lime|W
|bgcolor=yellow|SF
|bgcolor=ffebcd|QF
|bgcolor=afeeee|2R
|bgcolor=ffebcd|QF
|bgcolor=ffebcd|QF
|bgcolor=afeeee|3R
|bgcolor=yellow|SF
|A
|A
|A
|A
|A
|1 / 17
|44–16
|73%
|-
|align=left|Wimbledon
|A
|A
|A
|A
|bgcolor=afeeee|1R
|bgcolor=afeeee|1R
|bgcolor=afeeee|3R
|bgcolor=afeeee|3R
|bgcolor=afeeee|3R
|bgcolor=thistle|F
|bgcolor=ffebcd|QF
|bgcolor=thistle|F
|bgcolor=yellow|SF
|bgcolor=lime|W
|bgcolor=lime|W
|bgcolor=afeeee|2R
|bgcolor=yellow|SF
|bgcolor=afeeee|1R
|bgcolor=ffebcd|QF
|bgcolor=ffebcd|QF
|bgcolor=ffebcd|QF
|bgcolor=afeeee|3R
|A
|A
|A
|style=color:#767676|NH
|A
|A
|2 / 18
|51–16
|76%
|-
|align=left|US Open
|A
|A
|bgcolor=ecf2ff|Q2
|A
|bgcolor=afeeee|3R
|bgcolor=afeeee|3R
|bgcolor=afeeee|3R
|bgcolor=afeeee|3R
|bgcolor=afeeee|1R
|bgcolor=afeeee|2R
|bgcolor=afeeee|1R
|bgcolor=ffebcd|QF
|bgcolor=afeeee|2R
|bgcolor=afeeee|3R
|bgcolor=ffebcd|QF
|bgcolor=afeeee|3R
|bgcolor=afeeee|3R
|bgcolor=afeeee|1R
|bgcolor=afeeee|2R
|bgcolor=afeeee|3R
|bgcolor=ffebcd|QF
|bgcolor=afeeee|1R
|A
|A
|A
|A
|A
|A
|0 / 18
|28–18
|61%
|-style=font-weight:bold;background:#efefef
|style=text-align:left|Win–loss
|0–0
|0–0
|0–0
|0–0
|2–3
|2–4
|8–4
|5–3
|3–4
|8–4
|8–4
|10–4
|12–4
|16–3
|14–3
|14–3
|13–4
|5–4
|6–4
|12–4
|11–4
|4–3
|5–2
|0–1
|0–0
|0–0
|0–0
|0–0
|3 / 72
|158–69
|70%
|-
|colspan=32 align=left|Year-end championship
|-
|align=left|ATP Finals
|colspan=10 |Did Not Qualify
|bgcolor=thistle|F
|bgcolor=afeeee|RR
|DNQ
|bgcolor=lime|W|bgcolor=afeeee|RR
|bgcolor=lime|W|bgcolor=afeeee|RR
|colspan=2 |DNQ
|bgcolor=afeeee|RR
|bgcolor=afeeee|RR
| colspan="7" |Did Not Qualify
|bgcolor=efefef|2 / 8
|bgcolor=efefef|16–14
|bgcolor=efefef|53%
|-
|colspan=31 align=left|National representation|-
|align=left|Olympics1
|style=color:#767676|NH
|A
|colspan=3 style=color:#767676|Not Held
|bgcolor=afeeee|1R
|colspan=3 style=color:#767676|Not Held
|A
|colspan=3 style=color:#767676|Not Held
|bgcolor=afeeee|1R
|colspan=3 style=color:#767676|Not Held
|bgcolor=ffebcd|QF
|colspan=3 style=color:#767676|Not Held
|bgcolor=afeeee|2R
|colspan=4 style=color:#767676|Not Held
|A
|style=color:#767676|NH
|0 / 4
|3–4
|43%
|-
|align=left|Davis Cup
|bgcolor=ecf2ff|Z3
|bgcolor=ecf2ff|Z2
|bgcolor=ecf2ff|Z2
|bgcolor=ecf2ff|Z2
|A
|bgcolor=ecf2ff|Z3
|bgcolor=ecf2ff|Z2
|bgcolor=ecf2ff|Z2
|bgcolor=ecf2ff|Z2
|bgcolor=ecf2ff|Z1
|bgcolor=ecf2ff|Z1
|bgcolor=ecf2ff|PO
|bgcolor=ecf2ff|PO
|bgcolor=afeeee|1R
|bgcolor=afeeee|1R
|bgcolor=lime|W|bgcolor=yellow|SF
|bgcolor=ffebcd|QF
|bgcolor=thistle|F
|bgcolor=afeeee|1R
|bgcolor=ffebcd|QF
|bgcolor=ffebcd|QF
|bgcolor=yellow|SF
|A
|A
|style=color:#767676|NH
|A
|A
|1 / 10
|30–19
|61%
|- style=font-weight:bold;background:#efefef
|style=text-align:left|Win–loss
|5–0
|2–0
|1–1
|1–0
|0–0
|0–1
|0–1
|1–0
|2–1
|2–0
|1–1
|1–1
|2–0
|2–1
|2–0
|1–3
|2–1
|2–3
|2–2
|0–2
|1–1
|1–3
|2–1
|0–0
|0–0
|0–0
|0–0
|0–0
|1 / 14
|33–23
|59%
|-
|colspan=32 align=left|ATP World Tour Masters 1000|-
|align=left|Indian Wells
|A
|A
|A
|A
|A
|A
|bgcolor=afeeee|2R
|A
|bgcolor=afeeee|2R
|bgcolor=afeeee|2R
|bgcolor=ffebcd|QF
|bgcolor=ffebcd|QF
|A
|bgcolor=thistle|F
|bgcolor=afeeee|1R
|bgcolor=thistle|F
|bgcolor=afeeee|1R
|bgcolor=afeeee|1R
|bgcolor=afeeee|1R
|bgcolor=afeeee|2R
|bgcolor=yellow|SF
|bgcolor=yellow|SF
|bgcolor=ffebcd|QF
|A
|A
|style=color:#767676|NH
|A
|A
|0 / 15
|22–15
|59%
|-
|align=left|Miami
|A
|A
|A
|A
|bgcolor=afeeee|1R
|bgcolor=afeeee|1R
|bgcolor=ffebcd|QF
|A
|bgcolor=afeeee|1R
|bgcolor=afeeee|2R
|bgcolor=afeeee|1R
|bgcolor=afeeee|2R
|bgcolor=yellow|SF
|bgcolor=afeeee|1R
|bgcolor=afeeee|1R
|bgcolor=afeeee|2R
|bgcolor=ffebcd|QF
|bgcolor=ffebcd|QF
|bgcolor=ffebcd|QF
|bgcolor=ffebcd|QF
|bgcolor=afeeee|1R
|bgcolor=afeeee|1R
|bgcolor=afeeee|1R
|bgcolor=afeeee|1R
|A
|style=color:#767676|NH
|A
|A
|0 / 19
|16–19
|46%
|-
|align=left|Monte Carlo
|A
|A
|A
|A
|A
|bgcolor=afeeee|1R
|bgcolor=afeeee|1R
|bgcolor=afeeee|2R
|A
|bgcolor=lime|W|bgcolor=lime|W|bgcolor=thistle|F
|bgcolor=afeeee|2R
|bgcolor=afeeee|2R
|bgcolor=lime|W|bgcolor=lime|W|bgcolor=afeeee|2R
|bgcolor=yellow|SF
|bgcolor=lime|W|bgcolor=yellow|SF
|bgcolor=yellow|SF
|bgcolor=afeeee|2R
|bgcolor=afeeee|1R
|A
|A
|style=color:#767676|NH
|A
|A
|5 / 17
|31–12
|72%
|-
|align=left|Madrid
|colspan=7 style=color:#767676|Not Held
|bgcolor=afeeee|1R
|A
|bgcolor=afeeee|1R
|bgcolor=thistle|F
|bgcolor=ffebcd|QF
|bgcolor=afeeee|2R
|bgcolor=ffebcd|QF
|bgcolor=lime|W|bgcolor=thistle|F
|bgcolor=thistle|F
|bgcolor=afeeee|2R
|bgcolor=afeeee|1R
|bgcolor=lime|W|bgcolor=thistle|F
|bgcolor=ffebcd|QF
|bgcolor=afeeee|1R
|A
|A
|style=color:#767676|NH
|A
|A
|2 / 15
|23–13
|64%
|-
|align=left|Rome
|A
|A
|A
|A
|A
|A
|bgcolor=afeeee|1R
|A
|A
|bgcolor=afeeee|2R
|bgcolor=ffebcd|QF
|bgcolor=ffebcd|QF
|bgcolor=lime|W|bgcolor=thistle|F
|bgcolor=lime|W|bgcolor=afeeee|2R
|bgcolor=ffebcd|QF
|bgcolor=ffebcd|QF
|bgcolor=afeeee|2R
|bgcolor=lime|W|bgcolor=afeeee|2R
|bgcolor=afeeee|2R
|A
|A
|A
|A
|A
|A
|3 / 14
|20–11
|65%
|-
|align=left|Canada
|A
|A
|A
|A
|A
|A
|A
|bgcolor=afeeee|1R
|bgcolor=afeeee|1R
|bgcolor=afeeee|2R
|bgcolor=afeeee|2R
|bgcolor=ffebcd|QF
|bgcolor=afeeee|2R
|bgcolor=lime|W|bgcolor=yellow|SF
|bgcolor=ffebcd|QF
|bgcolor=lime|W|bgcolor=ffebcd|QF
|bgcolor=afeeee|1R
|bgcolor=yellow|SF
|bgcolor=ffebcd|QF
|bgcolor=afeeee|1R
|A
|A
|
|style=color:#767676|NH
|A
|A
|2 / 15
|18–13
|58%
|-
|align=left|Cincinnati
|A
|A
|A
|A
|A
|A
|A
|bgcolor=afeeee|1R
|bgcolor=afeeee|1R
|bgcolor=afeeee|1R
|bgcolor=ffebcd|QF
|bgcolor=ffebcd|QF
|bgcolor=ffebcd|QF
|bgcolor=yellow|SF
|bgcolor=lime|W|bgcolor=afeeee|2R
|bgcolor=thistle|F
|bgcolor=afeeee|1R
|bgcolor=afeeee|2R
|bgcolor=ffebcd|QF
|bgcolor=thistle|F
|bgcolor=afeeee|2R
|A
|A
|A
|A
|A
|A
|1 / 15
|18–13
|60%
|-
|align=left|Shanghai
|colspan=14 style=color:#767676|Not Held
|bgcolor=afeeee|2R
|bgcolor=ffebcd|QF
|bgcolor=thistle|F
|bgcolor=afeeee|2R
|bgcolor=afeeee|2R
|bgcolor=afeeee|2R
|bgcolor=ffebcd|QF
|bgcolor=ffebcd|QF
|bgcolor=afeeee|2R
|A
|A
|colspan=3 style=color:#767676|Not Held
|0 / 9
|9–9
|50%
|-
|align=left|Paris
|A
|A
|A
|A
|Q1
|bgcolor=ffebcd|QF
|bgcolor=yellow|SF
|bgcolor=afeeee|1R
|A
|bgcolor=afeeee|1R
|bgcolor=afeeee|1R
|bgcolor=thistle|F
|bgcolor=thistle|F
|bgcolor=afeeee|2R
|bgcolor=lime|W|bgcolor=ffebcd|QF
|bgcolor=ffebcd|QF
|bgcolor=afeeee|2R
|bgcolor=afeeee|2R
|bgcolor=afeeee|2R
|bgcolor=afeeee|2R
|bgcolor=afeeee|1R
|bgcolor=afeeee|1R
|A
|A
|A
|A
|A
|1 / 17
|19–16
|54%
|-
|align=left|Hamburg
|A
|A
|A
|A
|A
|A
|bgcolor=afeeee|2R
|A
|A
|bgcolor=afeeee|2R
|bgcolor=yellow|SF
|bgcolor=yellow|SF
|bgcolor=afeeee|2R
|bgcolor=lime|W|colspan=14 style=color:#767676|Not Masters Series
|1 / 6
|10–5
|67%
|-
|align=left|Stuttgart
|A
|A
|A
|A
|A
|bgcolor=yellow|SF
|bgcolor=ffebcd|QF
|colspan=21 style=color:#767676|Discontinued
|0 / 2
|4–2
|67%
|- style=font-weight:bold;background:#efefef
|style=text-align:left|Win–loss
|0–0
|0–0
|0–0
|0–0
|0–1
|5–4
|7–7
|1–5
|1–4
|10–8
|12–8
|15–9
|13–7
|18–7
|21–4
|14–8
|17–8
|8–9
|9–8
|17–7
|13–9
|7–8
|2–6
|0–1
|0–0
|0–0
|0–0
|0–0
|
|190–128 
|60%
|-
|colspan=32 align=left|Career statistics|-
!!!1995!!1996!!1997!!1998!!1999!!2000!!2001!!2002!!2003!!2004!!2005!!2006!!2007!!2008!!2009!!2010!!2011!!2012!!2013!!2014!!2015!!2016!!2017!!2018!!2019!!2020!!2021!!2022!! colspan=3|Career
|- style="background:#efefef;"
|style="text-align:left;"|Tournaments
|0
|0
|0
|2
|14
|23
|20
|17
|23
|26
|22
|22
|22
|23
|25
|25
|23
|24
|23
|23
|25
|24
|28
|9
|9
|1
|1
|0
|colspan=3|454|- style=font-weight:bold;background:#efefef
|style=text-align:left|Titles
|0
|0
|0
|0
|1
|2
|1
|1
|2
|1
|2
|3
|5
|5
|9
|7
|4
|3
|3
|4
|0
|0
|1
|0
|0
|0
|0
|0
|colspan=3|54
|- style=font-weight:bold;background:#efefef
|style=text-align:left|Finals
|0
|0
|0
|0
|2
|3
|3
|1
|4
|3
|5
|6
|7
|8
|11
|11
|8
|4
|4
|6
|4
|0
|1
|0
|0
|0
|0
|0
|colspan=3|91
|- style=font-weight:bold;background:#efefef
|style=text-align:left|Overall W–L
|0–0
|2–0
|1–1
|1–2
|14–12
|32–21
|33–20
|20–15
|31–21
|32–24
|33–22
|43–21
|49–18
|49–18
|61–17
|59–23
|50–22
|38–26
|31–22
|48–22
|41–28
|15–25
|25–27
|1–9
|0–9
|0–1
|0–1
|0–0
|colspan=3|710–427
|- bgcolor=efefef
|align=left|
|361
|248
|195
|125
|86
|29
|21
|51
|32
|18
|11
|11
|bgcolor=EEE8AA|5
|bgcolor=lime|1'|style=background:skyblue|3
|style=background:skyblue|3
|bgcolor=EEE8AA|6
|20
|14
|style=background:skyblue|3
|15
|61
|35
|461
|405
|460
|1241
|–
|colspan=3|
|}
1 Mixed doubles

Awards
1994
 Best Male Tennis Player in FR Yugoslavia
1996
 Best Male Tennis Player in FR Yugoslavia
1998
 Best Male Tennis Player in FR Yugoslavia
2001
 Best Male Tennis Player in FR Yugoslavia
2007
 Serbian Sport Association "May Award"
2008
 Year-end No. 1 (with Daniel Nestor)
 ATP Doubles Team of the Year (with Daniel Nestor)
 ITF Men's doubles World Champion (with Daniel Nestor)
2010
 Recognition for 50 matches played for Serbia Davis Cup team
2012
 Award Pride of the Nation'' by Serbia Tennis Federation
 Davis Cup Commitment Award
2013
 Davis Cup Award of Excellence

Records

Top 10 wins
He has a 1–4 (20%) record against players who were, at the time the match was played, ranked in the top 10.

See also
Serbia Davis Cup team
List of ATP number 1 ranked doubles players
List of Grand Slam men's doubles champions
List of Grand Slam mixed doubles champions
ATP Tour records
Sport in Serbia

References

External links

  
 
 
 
 
 

1976 births
Living people
Australian Open (tennis) champions
French Open champions
Olympic tennis players of Serbia
Olympic tennis players of Yugoslavia
Serbia and Montenegro male tennis players
Serbian male tennis players
Tennis players from Belgrade
Tennis players at the 2000 Summer Olympics
Tennis players at the 2008 Summer Olympics
Tennis players at the 2012 Summer Olympics
Tennis players at the 2016 Summer Olympics
Wimbledon champions
Yugoslav male tennis players
Grand Slam (tennis) champions in mixed doubles
Grand Slam (tennis) champions in men's doubles
ATP number 1 ranked doubles tennis players
ITF World Champions